The 10th and Pierce Car Barn is a historic car barn located at 1125 S. 11th Street in Omaha, Nebraska, United States. The building was used to house streetcars for the Omaha and Council Bluffs Street Railway Company (O&CB).

History

The 10th and Pierce Car Barn was initially conceived in 1909 in order to accommodate new streetcars for the O&CB. The new streetcars were larger and heavier than previous models and were designed so that passengers would pay as they entered. Work to clear the site began in 1909 and construction of the building began in August. While originally the O&CB planned to construct a one story facility, the slope of the site allowed for a two story building, whereby streetcars enter the building at either level to be stored. Both levels accommodated 12 tracks each. Upon the opening of the carbarn, the Harney Street carbarn was decommissioned. The 10th and Pierce carbarn remained in service until 1955, when streetcar service in Omaha was replaced by buses.

The carbarn is the only remaining O&CB structure in Omaha. In the 2010s, an 1889 carbarn and powerhouse at the southwest corner of 19th and Nicholas, as well as a 1905 general repair shop at the northwest corner of 26th and Lake were both demolished.

The building was added to the National Register of Historic Places on November 12, 2015.

References
 Kolb, Caitlin. 10th & Pierce Car Barn National Register of Historic Places Inventory-Nomination Form, 2015. On file at the National Park Service.

Railway buildings and structures on the National Register of Historic Places in Nebraska
National Register of Historic Places in Douglas County, Nebraska
Buildings and structures in Omaha, Nebraska
Railway buildings and structures on the National Register of Historic Places
Buildings and structures completed in 1910
Industrial buildings and structures on the National Register of Historic Places in Nebraska
History of Omaha, Nebraska